Beckton is an urban neighbourhood in east London.

Beckton may also refer to:

Places
 Beckton, Kentucky, US

Railway stations
 Beckton DLR station, on the Docklands Light Railway
 Beckton Park DLR station, on the Docklands Light Railway
 Beckton railway station, a former railway station

Other uses
 Norm Beckton (1898–1984), Australian Rules footballer
 Beckton (microprocessor), a microprocessor

See also
 Beckton Gas Works, in Beckton, London, formerly with spoil heaps known as "Beckton Alps"